Vetiver is the debut album by folk band Vetiver. It was released in 2004 on DiCristina.

Track listing
"Oh Papa" – 2:38
"Without a Song" – 4:36
"Farther On" – 2:49
"Amour Fou" with Devendra Banhart – 4:34
"Los Pajaros del Rio" with Devendra Banhart – 3:44
"Amerilie" – 3:14
"Arboretum" – 1:59
"Angels' Share" – with Hope Sandoval 4:21
"Luna Sea" – 4:17
"Belles" – 5:06
"On a Nerve" – 7:39

Personnel
Musicians
Alissa Anderson – cello
Devendra Banhart – guitar, vocals, background vocals
Andy Cabic – banjo, guitar, vocals
Jim Gaylord – violin
Nick Holdzkom – piano
Craig Koozer – bass, bass guitar
Joanna Newsom – harp
Colm O'Ciosoig – drums
Hope Sandoval – vocals

Production
Thom Monahan – audio engineer, audio production, engineer

References

2004 debut albums
Vetiver albums